Keegan Hall is a Seattle-based pencil artist who returned to art in 2015. Prior to returning to art, Keegan was involved with multiple successful startups.

Art
According to NBC's Today Show, Keegan started drawing again following the expected death of his mother.  Previous to that moment, he had not drawn in nearly 10 years.  Keegan quickly became the favorite artist of many stars and celebrities.

One of his first drawings was of Seattle Seahawks Kam Chancellor and, after Kam spotted the drawing on social media, he reached out to Keegan for his own original drawing.  That exposure led to another friend wanting to give a Hall original to Seattle Mariners pitcher Félix Hernández. "Felix started following on Instagram," said Hall. Next, the Seattle Storm recruited Hall for a drawing to be an incentive for season ticket renewals. 

Keegan was also selected by the Seattle Sounders to design the official poster for the 2016 MLS Cup in which the Sounders went on to become league champions.  However, a defining moment for Keegan's young artistic career came when he created an original drawing for former President Barack Obama.

Charity work
Keegan has also been involved with various community initiatives to raise money for charity. His first fundraiser was with Seattle Seahawks Cornerback Richard Sherman, which sold out on the first day and raised over $40,000 for The Blanket Coverage Foundation.  He then went on to work with stars such as Seattle Seahawks Quarterback Russell Wilson, Macklemore and Ryan Lewis, Seattle SuperSonics' Gary Payton, NFL stars JuJu Smith-Schuster and Adoree' Jackson, Seahawks Michael Bennett, and many others.

References 

American artists
People from Seattle
1981 births
Living people